Dušan Jelić (born 13 August 1974) is a Serbian-Greek professional basketball coach and former player. At a height of 2.11 m (6'11") tall, he played at the center position.

Coaching career 
In February 2021, Jelić was hired as the new head coach of Napredak Aleksinac of the Basketball League of Serbia.

Personal life
Like many players from the former Yugoslavia during the 1990s, Jelić obtained Greek citizenship, while playing in the country, and thus competed as a domestic player under the name Ntousan Koutsopoulos (Greek: Ντοὐσαν Κουτσόπουλος). In Greece, he is also known by the name Dušan Jelic Koutsopoulos.

References

External links
 Euroleague.net Profile 
 Eurobasket.com Profile
 Spanish League Profile 
 Italian League Profile 
 Balkan League Profile

1974 births
Living people
APOEL B.C. players
Apollon Patras B.C. players
Asseco Gdynia players
BC Kalev/Cramo players
CB Lucentum Alicante players
BK Ventspils players
Centers (basketball)
Greek expatriate basketball people in Cyprus
Greek expatriate basketball people in Italy
Greek expatriate basketball people in Latvia
Greek expatriate basketball people in Poland
Greek expatriate basketball people in Russia
Greek expatriate basketball people in Spain
Greek expatriate basketball people in Serbia
Greek men's basketball players
Greek people of Serbian descent
KK Crvena zvezda players
KK FMP (1991–2011) players
KK Włocławek players
KK Lions/Swisslion Vršac players
KK Napredak Aleksinac coaches
Liga ACB players
Makedonikos B.C. players
Olympiacos B.C. players
Orlandina Basket players
Panionios B.C. players
Saski Baskonia players
Serbian expatriate basketball people in Bulgaria
Serbian expatriate basketball people in Cyprus
Serbian expatriate basketball people in Estonia
Serbian expatriate basketball people in Greece
Serbian expatriate basketball people in Italy
Serbian expatriate basketball people in Iran
Serbian expatriate basketball people in Latvia
Serbian expatriate basketball people in Tunisia
Serbian expatriate basketball people in Poland
Serbian expatriate basketball people in Russia
Serbian expatriate basketball people in Spain
Serbian men's basketball coaches
Serbian men's basketball players
S.S. Felice Scandone players